José Pedro Barroca da Silva (23 May 1937 – 17 May 2015) was a Portuguese professional footballer.

Career statistics

Club

Notes

References

External links

1937 births
2015 deaths
Portuguese footballers
Portugal youth international footballers
Association football goalkeepers
Primeira Liga players
Segunda Divisão players
S.L. Benfica footballers
Sporting CP footballers
S.C. Farense players
S.C. Olhanense players
Footballers from Lisbon